Maie B. Havey (born Marie Judge, and sometimes credited as Maibelle Havey or M.B. Havey or Marie Havey) was an American screenwriter active during the earliest years of Hollywood. During her decade in the industry, she was credited on nearly 70 screenplays.

Biography 
Maie was born in New York City to Joseph Judge and Mary Kane; her father died when she was young. Her pen name may have come from a stepfather her mother remarried when she was young. In 1913, Maie — who had worked as a magazine writer — was signed as a scenarist for the Lubin Manufacturing Company, and she later worked at Universal and Bessie Barriscale Pictures. She was close friends with actress Fay Tincher, with whom she often worked; the pair even lived together for a time. Little is known of what became of her after 1920, when she wrote her last known scenario for Hollywood.

Selected filmography 

 The Notorious Mrs. Sands (1920)
 Kitty Kelly, M.D. (1920)
 Her Purchase Price (1919)
 Tangled Threads (1919)
 Hearts Asleep (1919)
 A Trick of Fate (1919)
 Her Body in Bond (1918)
 A Jewel in Pawn (1917)
 The Clock (1917)
 Her Soul's Inspiration (1917)
 The Devil's Bondwoman (1916) 
 The Unnecessary Sex (1915)
 The Haunted House (1913)
 Madonna of the Storm (1913)
 Blind Love (1912)
 The Smile of a Child (1911)

References 

American women screenwriters
1889 births
Year of death missing
Screenwriters from New York (state)
1971 deaths